The Webley Self-Loading Pistol was an early magazine-fed pistol. The gun was designed in 1910 by the Webley & Scott company. The Mk. 1 entered police service in 1911 in a .32 ACP model for the London Metropolitan Police. The .455 version was adopted by the Royal Navy in 1912 as the first automatic pistol in British service. The pistol was also adopted by the Royal Horse Artillery and the Royal Flying Corps. Its predecessor was the unsuccessful Mars Automatic Pistol.

Service use
They were issued to pilots of the Royal Naval Air Service. While principally issued as sidearms there was some intent that they be used to shoot other planes.

Problems
The pistol's original cordite cartridge left a lot of residue in the barrel causing frequent jamming. This was resolved in 1914 with nitrocellulose instead of cordite in the .455 cartridge. This new cartridge for the Mk.1 was called the Mark Iz.

Had Webley invested in more research and development of its pistol and ammunition and new technologies, the result would have been a better firearm produced more quickly. Particularly given the increasing adoption of the semi-automatic pistol by foreign armed forces and the extensive testing and development data available from previous efforts by other manufacturers.

Improvements and variations
The first models of the Mk. 1 had the safety on left side of the hammer. This was later moved to the left side of the frame, where it could lock the slide. Service versions were also outfitted with a grip safety.

References

External links 
 High resolution picture of a Webley Self-Loading Pistol

Semi-automatic pistols
Semi-automatic pistols of the United Kingdom
World War I British infantry weapons
World War II infantry weapons of the United Kingdom